Dunedin West was a New Zealand parliamentary electorate, in the city of Dunedin. It existed for three periods between 1881 and 1996 and was represented by seven Members of Parliament.

Population centres
The previous electoral redistribution was undertaken in 1875 for the 1875–1876 election. In the six years since, New Zealand's European population had increased by 65%. In the 1881 electoral redistribution, the House of Representatives increased the number of European representatives to 91 (up from 84 since the 1875–76 election). The number of Māori electorates was held at four. The House further decided that electorates should not have more than one representative, which led to 35 new electorates being formed, including Dunedin West, and two electorates that had previously been abolished to be recreated. This necessitated a major disruption to existing boundaries.

The 1981 census had shown that the North Island had experienced further population growth, and three additional general seats were created through the 1983 electoral redistribution, bringing the total number of electorates to 95. The South Island had, for the first time, experienced a population loss, but its number of general electorates was fixed at 25 since the 1967 electoral redistribution. More of the South Island population was moving to Christchurch, and two electorates were abolished, while two electorates were recreated (including Dunedin West). In the North Island, six electorates were newly created, three electorates were recreated, and six electorates were abolished.

The electorate was urban, and comprised a number of suburbs in the west of Dunedin.

History
The electorate existed in the 19th century from 1881 to 1890. It was represented by:
 Thomas Dick 1881–84 (defeated)
 William Downie Stewart 1884–90 (retired)

The electorate was recreated, from 1908 to 1946. Stewart's son, also called William Downie Stewart, represented the electorate for the Reform Party from 1914 to 1935, when he was defeated by Labour's Gervan McMillan.

In 1984 the electorate was recreated again, until the introduction of MMP in 1996. Clive Matthewson represented the electorate from 1984 to 1996. He left the New Zealand Labour Party in 1995, and was one of the founders of the United New Zealand party.

Members of Parliament
Dunedin West was represented by seven Members of Parliament.

Key

Election results

1993 election

1990 election

1987 election

1984 election

1943 election

1938 election

1935 election

1931 election

1928 election

Notes

References

Historical electorates of New Zealand
Politics of Dunedin
1881 establishments in New Zealand
1908 establishments in New Zealand
1984 establishments in New Zealand
1890 disestablishments in New Zealand
1946 disestablishments in New Zealand
1996 disestablishments in New Zealand